Blake Speers (born January 2, 1997) is a Canadian professional ice hockey centre who is currently playing with Västerås IK in the HockeyAllsvenskan (Allsv). He has formerly played in the National Hockey League (NHL) with the New Jersey Devils and the Arizona Coyotes.

Playing career
Speers began his major junior career playing with the Sault Ste. Marie Greyhounds in the Ontario Hockey League before he was drafted in the 3rd round, 67th overall, by the New Jersey Devils in the 2015 NHL Entry Draft. On September 21, 2016, Speers signed a three-year entry-level contract with the Devils. On October 11, 2016, it was announced that Speers had made the Devils opening night roster for the 2016–17 season. He made his NHL debut on October 13, 2016 in a 2–1 overtime defeat against the Florida Panthers. After three scoreless games with the Devils, Speers was returned for his final junior eligible season with the Greyhounds on October 24, 2016.

On December 16, 2019, Speers was traded to the Arizona Coyotes as a part of the Taylor Hall trade.

As a free agent from the Coyotes following the  season, Speers left North America to pursue a European career in agreeing to a one-year deal with Swedish second tier club, Västerås IK of the Allsvenksa, on August 1, 2022.

Career statistics

Regular season and playoffs

International

References

External links
 

1997 births
Living people
Albany Devils players
Arizona Coyotes players
Binghamton Devils players
Canadian ice hockey centres
Ice hockey people from Ontario
New Jersey Devils draft picks
New Jersey Devils players
Sault Ste. Marie Greyhounds players
Sportspeople from Sault Ste. Marie, Ontario
Tucson Roadrunners players